Washington Township is a township in Shelby County, Iowa. There are 434 people and 12 people per square mile in  Washington Township. The total area is 36 square miles.

References

Townships in Shelby County, Iowa
Townships in Iowa